Jonathan Gannon (born January 4, 1983) is an American football coach who is the head coach for the Arizona Cardinals of the National Football League (NFL). He also previously served as an assistant coach for the Atlanta Falcons, Tennessee Titans, Minnesota Vikings, Indianapolis Colts, and Philadelphia Eagles.

Early years
A native of Cleveland, Ohio, Gannon attended Saint Ignatius High School where he was a successful three-sport athlete, winning a state championship in basketball as a point guard, a district champion as a hurdler in track, and was also a standout wide receiver and defensive back.

Gannon went on to play at the University of Louisville until he suffered a career-ending injury. He remained with the program as a volunteer assistant during the 2003–2005 seasons. He was a graduate assistant the next season for Louisville.

Coaching career

Atlanta Falcons
In 2007, Gannon was hired by the Atlanta Falcons as a defensive quality control coach, following Bobby Petrino to the National Football League.

St. Louis Rams
In 2009, Gannon was hired by the St. Louis Rams as a college scout. He was promoted to a pro scout in 2010 and left the Rams in 2011.

Tennessee Titans
In 2012, Gannon returned to coaching and was hired by the Tennessee Titans as a defensive quality control coach, a position he served at until 2013.

Minnesota Vikings
In 2014, Gannon was hired by the Minnesota Vikings as their assistant defensive backs and defensive quality control coach. He served in this role for four seasons before leaving the Vikings following the 2017 season.

Indianapolis Colts
In 2018, Gannon was hired by the Indianapolis Colts as their defensive backs and cornerbacks coach under head coach Frank Reich and stayed there until 2020.

Philadelphia Eagles
In 2021, Gannon was hired by the Philadelphia Eagles as the team's defensive coordinator.

Arizona Cardinals
Two days after losing Super Bowl LVII, Gannon was hired by the Arizona Cardinals as their head coach on February 14, 2023.

Head coaching record

Personal life
Gannon is married and has three children.

References

External links
 Arizona Cardinals profile

1983 births
Living people
American football defensive backs
American football wide receivers
Arizona Cardinals head coaches
Atlanta Falcons coaches
Coaches of American football from Ohio
Indianapolis Colts coaches
Louisville Cardinals football coaches
Minnesota Vikings coaches
National Football League defensive coordinators
Philadelphia Eagles coaches
Players of American football from Cleveland
Sportspeople from Cleveland
Saint Ignatius High School (Cleveland) alumni
St. Louis Rams scouts
Tennessee Titans coaches
University of Louisville alumni